Bajo Cauca Antioquia is a subregion in the Colombian Department of Antioquia. The region is made up by 6 municipalities. The region cover most of the lower valley of the Cauca River with the department of Antioquia.

Municipalities

 Cáceres
 Caucasia
 El Bagre
 Nechí
 Tarazá
 Zaragoza

External links 
 BajoCauca.com, Bajo Cauca news portal

Regions of Antioquia Department